Huating may refer to the following locations:

Huating, Gansu
Huating County, Jiangsu, former name of Songjiang District, now in Shanghai
Huating Temple in the Western Mountains, Kunming
Huating Town, Shanghai, town in and subdivision of Jiading District
Huating, Fujian, town in and subdivision of Chengxiang District, Putian
Huating, Jiangxi, town in and subdivision of Shangrao County